Bernard Tilakaratna, SLOS (1927–2004) was a senior diplomat and bureaucrat of the Sri Lankan government. He was an ambassador to many countries and prior to retirement was the permanent secretary to Ministry of Foreign Affairs.

Early life
He was born on 8 December 1927 in Sri Lanka and schooled at St Thomas' College, Mount Lavinia.  He then enrolled into the University of Ceylon, where he obtained his B.A. Degree.

Diplomatic career
He joined the Ceylon Foreign Service in May 1951. In various capacities, he served in the Sri Lanka Foreign Ministry and missions abroad.

Tilakaratna was in India during the height of the terrorist conflict in Sri Lanka and had to negotiate with the Indian Government on many occasions. In Thimphu, Bhutan, he attended peace talks with the terrorist organisation, Liberation Tamil Tigers Eelam (LTTE)

He was appointed as Foreign Secretary to the Ministry of Sri Lanka, which he served under President Ranasinghe Premadasa. He was the first Foreign Secretary to be appointed from the ranks of career diplomats of the Sri Lanka Foreign Service.

Posts held
March 1989 - August 1994: Foreign Secretary, Ministry of Foreign Affairs, Colombo
August 1982- February 1989: High Commissioner, India (concurrently to Bhutan, Nepal)
June 1980 - July 1982: Director General, Ministry of Foreign Affairs, Colombo
September 1974 - May 1980: Ambassador, Japan (concurrently to South Korea and Philippines)
March 1974 - August 1974: Director General, Ministry of Foreign Affairs, Colombo
January 1971 - February 1974: Director of Foreign Relations (Europe, then Asia & Africa), Colombo
December 1968 - December 1970: Deputy High Commissioner, New Delhi
August 1966 - November 1968: Deputy Permanent Representative, United Nations, New York
January 1965 - July 1966: Charge d'affairs: Rio de Janeiro
January 1963 - December 1964: Chief of Protocol, Ministry of Foreign Affairs, Colombo
March 1961 - December 1962: First Secretary, New Delhi
April 1960 - February 1961: First Secretary, Moscow
June 1958 - March 1960: Second Secretary, Paris
October 1956- May 1958: Assistant Secretary, Ministry of Foreign Affairs, Colombo
August 1953 - September 1956: Trade Commissioner, India
September 1952 - July 1953: Official Secretary, Jakarta
June 1952 - August 1952: Attache, Rangoon

Family
He has two daughters and a son. The elder daughter , Mrs. Shiranthi Wimalaguna is married to Dr.Dharmapala Wimalaguna and resides in Australia. The younger daughter, Mrs.Krishanthi Weerakoon is married to Mr.Esala Weerakoon who is the current president of the SAARC Organization. He is  the son of another well known Sri Lankan civil servant, Bradman Weerakoon. 
His son Prasanna Tilakaratna is a scientist and resides in The USA.

Death
He died on 30 September 2004 from a long-standing illness (Lymphoma).

References 

1927 births
2004 deaths
Sri Lankan Buddhists
Alumni of the University of Ceylon
Deaths from lymphoma
High Commissioners of Sri Lanka to India
Ambassadors of Sri Lanka to Bhutan
Ambassadors of Sri Lanka to Nepal
Ambassadors of Sri Lanka to Japan
Ambassadors of Sri Lanka to South Korea
Ambassadors of Sri Lanka to the Philippines
Sinhalese civil servants
Sri Lankan diplomats